In Concert at the Outpost Performance Space, Albuquerque 2004 is a live recording of the late clarinetist Kenny Davern and his quartet, a recording of swinging dixieland music.

Track listing 
Ole Miss (8:24)     
Careless Love (6:04)     
Somebody Stole My Gal (8:17)     
Summertime (9:40)     
Spreadin' Knowledge Around (6:33)     
C.C. Rider (9:18)     
These Foolish Things (5:00)     
Royal Garden Blues (10:20)

Personnel
Kenny Davern – clarinet
Greg Cohen – double-bass
James Chirillo – guitar
Tony DeNicola – drums

References

Kenny Davern albums
Dixieland albums
Dixieland revival albums
Live swing albums
2005 live albums
Arbors Records live albums